The Midnight Man is a 1917 American crime drama silent black and white film directed by Elmer Clifton and written by Tom Gibson. It is based on the story of Bess Meredyth.

Cast
 Jack Mulhall as Bob Moore
 Ann Kroman as Irene Hardin
 Al MacQuarrie as The 'Eel'
 Warda Lamont as Molly
 Hal Wilson as Mr. Moore
 Wilbur Higby as John Hardin
 Jack Carlyle

References

External links

 
 

American crime drama films
1917 crime drama films
1917 films
Silent crime drama films
American black-and-white films
Films directed by Elmer Clifton
Films with screenplays by Tom Gibson
Universal Pictures films
1910s American films
Silent American drama films